Great Soul: Mahatma Gandhi and His Struggle With India is a 2011 biography of Indian political and spiritual leader Mohandas Karamchand Gandhi written by Pulitzer Prize-winning author Joseph Lelyveld and published by Alfred A Knopf.

The book is split between the time Gandhi spent in South Africa and his return to India as the Mahatma.

Great Soul: Mahatma Gandhi and His Struggle with India claims that the founder of modern India had a sexual relationship with Hermann Kallenbach, a German-Jewish bodybuilder, and also made disparaging remarks about black Africans during his early years in South Africa.

One criticism is Lelyveld’s use of documentary evidence and informed opinion to point to the relationship that Gandhi had developed with a Prussian architect whom the Indian playfully boasted as “having received physical training at the hands of [Eugen] Sandow [the father of modern bodybuilding]”. Lelyveld’s inquiry includes quotes from a letter sent by Gandhi to Kallenbach from London in 1909: “Your portrait (the only one) stands on my mantelpiece in the bedroom. The mantelpiece is opposite to the bed… [The purpose of which] is to show to you and me how completely you have taken possession of my body. This is slavery with a vengeance.”. Later, the Indian government bought several personal letters.

Critical and popular reception

Response in India
The Legislative Assembly of Gujarat, the lawmaking body of Gandhi's home state, voted unanimously on March 20, 2011, to ban Great Soul because of the controversy. Lelyveld has stated that the gay interpretation of his work is a mistake. "The book does not say that Gandhi was bisexual or homosexual. It says that he was celibate and deeply attached to Kallenbach. This is not news."

Review by the New York Times
Writing for The New York Times, Hari Kunzru finds Great Soul to be "judicious and thoughtful". Lelyveld's book, he writes, will be revelatory to American readers who may only be familiar with the rudiments of Gandhi's life and for those readers, perhaps especially Indian readers, who are better acquainted with the Gandhi story the book's portrait of the man will still be challenging.

Reports of passages within the book regarding the nature of Gandhi and Kallenbach's relationship prompted the Wall Street Journal to ponder "Was Gandhi gay?" Kunzru for the Times observes that modern readers who are less familiar with the concept of Platonic love may interpret the relationship, in particular their romantic-sounding letters, as indicating a sexually charged relationship. However, he adds that Gandhi in 1906 took a vow of celibacy, which both Gandhi and the people of India saw as a cornerstone of his moral authority.

Review by the Wall Street Journal
British historian Andrew Roberts, in writing for The Wall Street Journal, counters this idea of celibacy, with descriptions of Gandhi's 'testing' of his vow of celibacy with young women. He also quotes passages from Gandhi's letters to Kallenbach included in the text, such as "how completely you have taken possession of my body. This is slavery with a vengeance" to support his conclusion that Gandhi was a "sexual weirdo" along with being "a political incompetent and a fanatical faddist".

Other reviews
 By Christopher Hitchens, July 2011 in The Atlantic
 3 March 2013 in the Hindustan Times

See also

2011 in literature

References

External links
 How outrage gripped Gandhi’s recalcitrant nation by Thomas Weber, July 2011 from inside.com.au

2011 non-fiction books
American biographies
Biographies about politicians
Alfred A. Knopf books
Censorship in India
Books about Mahatma Gandhi
Censored books
LGBT-related controversies in literature